A list of films made in the Republic of Estonia since 1991: For a list of Estonian films released prior to 1991, see List of Estonian films.

1990s

2000s

2010s

2020s

References

 
 

1991